The Phantom Rider is a 1946 American Western film serial from Republic Pictures starring Robert Kent and Peggy Stewart. It was later re-released under the new title Ghost Riders of the West.

Plot summary
Dr Jim Sterling attempts to create a police force on the Big Tree Indian Reservation. However, his efforts face sabotage, secretly directed by the apparently friendly Indian Agent Fred Carson, whose gang is currently able to rob stagecoaches wagons without opposition.  In order to defeat his enemies, Sterling adopts the name and costume of the legendary "Phantom Rider".

Cast
Robert Kent as Dr Jim Sterling and The Phantom Rider
Peggy Stewart as Doris Shannon, school teacher
LeRoy Mason as Fred Carson, villain secretly sabotaging the reservation to maintain his interests
George J. Lewis as Blue Feather, Sterling's sidekick
Kenne Duncan as Ben Brady
Hal Taliaferro as Nugget, miner
Chief Thundercloud as Chief Yellow Wolf
Tom London as Ceta
Roy Barcroft as The Marshal
Monte Hale as Cass
Hugh Prosser as Keeler

Production
The Phantom Rider was budgeted at $140,207 although the final negative cost was $138,925 (a $1,282, or 0.9%, under spend). It was filmed between 25 July and 22 August 1945. The serial's production number was 1499.

Stunts
Wayne Burson
Tommy Coats
Fred Graham
Cliff Lyons
Ted Mapes
Eddie Parker
Post Park (coach)
Tom Steele (fights)
Duke Taylor (horseback)
Dale Van Sickel (horseback)
Henry Wills (horseback)
Bill Yrigoyen (horseback/fights)
Joe Yrigoyen (horseback/fights)

Special effects
All special effects by the Lydecker brothers.

Release

Theatrical
The Phantom Rider'''s official release date is 26 January 1946, although this is actually the date the sixth chapter was made available to film exchanges.  The serial was re-released on 11 October 1954, under the new title Ghost Riders of the West, between the first runs of Man with the Steel Whip and Panther Girl of the Kongo''.

Chapter titles
 The Avenging Spirit (20min)
 Flaming Ambush (13min 20s)
 Hoofs of Doom [sic] (13min 20s)
 Murder Masquerade (13min 20s)
 Flying Fury (13min 20s)
 Blazing Peril (13min 20s)
 Gauntlet of Guns (13min 20s)
 Behind the Mask (13min 20s) - a re-cap chapter
 The Captive Chief (13min 20s)
 Beasts at Bay (13min 20s)
 The Death House (13min 20s)
 The Last Stand (13min 20s)
Source:

See also
 List of film serials
 List of film serials by studio

References

External links

1946 films
1946 Western (genre) films
American black-and-white films
1940s English-language films
Republic Pictures film serials
Films directed by Spencer Gordon Bennet
Films directed by Fred C. Brannon
American Western (genre) films
1940s American films